On the Torment of Saints, the Casting of Spells and the Evocation of Spirits is an album of contemporary classical music by John Zorn, written in 2012, recorded in New York City in March & July 2013, and released on the Tzadik label in November 2013. The album features compositions inspired by William Shakespeare, Halloween and Anthony the Great and the cover art features paintings by Salvador Dalí, Goya and Michelangelo.

Track listing
All compositions by John Zorn
 "The Tempest" - 11:20   
 "All Hallows Eve: i Matins" - 9:29 
 "All Hallows Eve: ii Lauds" - 4:09   
 "All Hallows Eve: iii Vespers" - 1:37   
 "The Temptations of St. Anthony" - 8:46

Personnel

Track One
International Contemporary Ensemble: 
Claire Chase - flute 
Joshua Rubin - clarinet, bass clarinet
Nathan Davis - drums, percussion

Tracks Two to Four
Chris Otto - violin 
David Fulmer - viola
Jay Campbell - cello

Track Five
Fifth House Ensemble:
Melissa Snoza - flute
Crystal Hall - English horn
Jennifer Woodrum - clarinet
Karl Rzasa - bassoon
Matt Monroe - French horn
Jani Parsons - piano
Andrew Williams - violin
Clark Carruth - viola
Herine Coetzee Koschak - cello
Eric Snoza - bass

Production
Marc Urselli (tracks 1-4),  Bill Maylone (track 5) - engineer, audio mixer
Scott Hull - mastering
John Zorn and Kazunori Sugiyama – producers
Caleb Burhans - session producer, The Temptations of St. Anthony

References
 

2013 albums
John Zorn albums
Albums produced by John Zorn
Tzadik Records albums